"Everybody Clap" is a song written by Maurice Gibb and Billy Lawrie, and was released by Lulu. The single's B-side was "After the Feeling is Gone" in UK and "Goodbye My Love Goodbye" in US. And this single was released in Atlantic Records in UK and Atco Records in US.

The song was written and produced by Maurice Gibb of the Bee Gees, Gibb also played guitar on this song (and sing backing vocals) with Billy Lawrie on background vocals. Leslie Harvey, who plays guitar on this track was also a member of Stone the Crows, Gibb's friend John Bonham of Led Zeppelin played drums on this song, Cream member Jack Bruce played bass on this song. This song was recorded on January 11 in Nova Sound Studios in London

The track failed to reach the official UK singles top 50, despite being given considerable TV air time, including a performance on Top of the Pops where Lulu was accompanied by Gibb, Bruce and Bonham and the dance troupe Pan's People.

Personnel
 Lulu — lead vocals
 Billy Lawrie — background vocals
 Maurice Gibb — guitar, background vocals
 Leslie Harvey — guitar
 Jack Bruce — bass
 John Bonham — drums
 Gerry Shury — orchestral arrangement

References

Lulu (singer) songs
Songs written by Maurice Gibb
Song recordings produced by Maurice Gibb
1971 singles
Atlantic Records singles
Atco Records singles
1971 songs
Songs written by Billy Lawrie